Sindhu is a 1975 Indian Malayalam film, directed by J. Sasikumar and produced by R. Somanathan, starring Prem Nazir, Madhu, Lakshmi and Vidhubala. Its musical score was composed by M. K. Arjunan. It is a remake of the Tamil film Pugundha Veedu released in 1972. The film was also remade in Telugu as Puttinillu Mettinillu, with actress Lakshmi reprising her role in all 3 versions.

Cast

Prem Nazir as Jayan
Madhu as Rajendran
Lakshmi as Sindhu
Vidhubala as Geetha
Kaviyoor Ponnamma as Parvathi Amma
Adoor Bhasi as Venu | Venu's Father
Sreelatha Namboothiri as Kalyani / Kala
T. S. Muthaiah as Govinda Menon

Soundtrack
The music was composed by M. K. Arjunan and the lyrics were written by Sreekumaran Thampi.

References

External links
 
 

1975 films
1970s Malayalam-language films
Indian drama films
Malayalam remakes of Tamil films
1975 drama films